Aurélia Petit (18 April 1971) is a French actress. In the year 1984, Petit began her theater career. For a year, she went to theater school with the famous Niels Arestrup. Since 1993, she has been seen in French television shows and movies. In 2006 she played the clerk Martine in the film The Science of Sleep by Michel Gondry.

Filmography 
 1996: Le Dernier Chaperon rouge
 1998: Ein bißchen Liebe (Laisse un peu d’amour)
 1998: Histoire naturelle
 1998: Papa ist jetzt im Himmel (Papa est monté au ciel)
 1999: Lila Lili
 1999: La Nouvelle Ève
 1999: 1999 Madeleine
 2000: Un possible amour
 2000: La Commune (Paris, 1871)
 2002: Les Diables
 2006: The Science of Sleep
 2006: Looking for Cheyenne (Oublier Cheyenne)
 2006: Barrage
 2009: Nord Paradis
 2009: Louise Michel
 2008: Musée haut, musée bas
 2009: L’Enfance du mal
 2009: Ivül
 2010: Tournée 
 2010: Monsieur l’Abbé
 2012: Beau ravage
 2012: An Open Heart
 2013: Le Temps de l’aventure
 2013: Un château en Italie
 2014: Weekends in Normandy
 2015: Marguerite & Julien
 2019: Osmosis
 2021: A Tale of Love and Desire

References

https://web.archive.org/web/20160303204852/http://mutualise.artishoc.com/cite/media/5/dpresse_lettres_de_la_guerre.pdf

External links

 

Living people
1971 births
Place of birth missing (living people)
20th-century French actresses
21st-century French actresses
French film actresses
French television actresses